Pollenia townsendi is a species of cluster fly in the family Polleniidae.

Distribution
India.

References

Polleniidae
Insects described in 1940
Diptera of Asia